9 Equulei is an M-type star in the constellation Equuleus.  It is an asymptotic giant branch (AGB) star, a star that has exhausted its core helium and is now fusing both hydrogen and helium in shells outside the core.  It is also a suspected variable star with an amplitude of about 0.05 magnitudes.

The spectral type is M2IIIa, meaning it is a relatively cool giant star. As an AGB star, it is burning hydrogen and helium in shells around an inert carbon-oxygen core.

References 

Equuleus
M-type giants
Equulei, 09
105413
203291
8163
Durchmusterung objects
Suspected variables